Lucas Ansah-Peprah (born 16 January 2000) is a German athlete. He competed in the men's 4 × 100 metres relay event at the 2020 Summer Olympics.

Personal life
Born in Germany, Ansah-Peprah is of Ghanaian descent.

References

External links
 

2000 births
Living people
German male sprinters
German sportspeople of Ghanaian descent
Athletes (track and field) at the 2020 Summer Olympics
Olympic athletes of Germany
Sportspeople from Stuttgart
21st-century German people